Cariye ("Jariya") was a title and term used for category of enslaved women concubines in the Islamic world of the Middle East. They are particularly known in history from the era of the Ottoman Empire, where they legally existed until the mid-19th century.

History

General meaning

The general meaning of the term  was a woman enslaved during warfare. This remained the formal definition of the term in the Islamic world. The rights of the enslaved woman was regulated within Islamic law.

The enslavement of women was permitted only during warfare of a war deemed "just"; that is, a war against non-Muslims. Only a non-Muslim woman could be enslaved during warfare, as Islam banned Muslims from enslaving other Muslims.

In Islamic law, the enslavement of a woman was the only case in which concubinage was legally permitted. A woman taken as a  concubine had to obey her male owner as she would a husband. However, the children, male or female, of a cariye concubine and her master were born legally free and, due to being the mother of her master's children, the cariye concubine could not be sold by her master to anyone else and would also be automatically emancipated after his death.

Ottoman Empire

The  system existed in the Ottoman Empire far into the 19th century and is most famous within the Ottoman Imperial Harem of the Ottoman court. It has often been translated to mean "lady-in-waiting".

The Ottoman system formally followed the original Islamic law, but varied from it in practice. After the Ottoman Empire had conquered most of the Middle East, and after the borders to Christian Europe had come to a standstill, there was in practice few opportunities to capture women through warfare.

Because of the general ban for enslavement of Muslims, the non-Muslim  was instead provided to the Ottoman slave market from Christian Europe through the Crimean slave trade and the Barbary slave trade. Being from non-Muslim countries, with whom the Ottoman Empire could be regarded to be in passive warfare, this was regarded equivalent to enslaved prisoners of war, and thus was perceived to be in accordance with Islamic law.

When the Crimean slave trade was closed after the Russian conquest of the Crimea in 1783 (and the Barbary slave trade in the early 19th-century), the  slave trade underwent yet another transformation. While the Circassians were normally Muslim, the ban against the enslavement of Muslims was overlooked in their case, and their original Muslim status was an "open secret".

The  was always regarded as sexually available for the master of the house, and if she bore a child by him, she could no longer be sold. In a Muslim society based on gender segregation, were women lived in seclusion, it was not a possibility for a manumitted woman to simply leave the house and walk about in the street, as a free unmarried woman without family would have no way to support herself. Instead, the manumission of a woman normally meant that a marriage was arranged for her; often, a male who freed a woman married her himself, or arranged for her to be married to another man.

There was a difference between women bought to be domestic servants of Muslim women, and women bought by men; the slave women who were formally the property of a Muslim woman, although legally available for the master of the house, could also be sold by her female owner.

In the first half of the 19th century, slavery had come to be regarded as morally wrong in the Western world. The liberal Sultan Abdulmejid I, who was affected by these views, included anti-slavery laws among his Westernized reforms, and formally banned the  slavery system. This was, however, a formal ban, and in reality, the  continued informally until the end of the 19th century.

Ottoman Imperial Harem

 were provided for the Ottoman Imperial Harem through the Crimean slave trade and the Barbary slave trade, or recruited within the empire. They were selected from among the most beautiful and intelligent girls, and came to the harem as children. They were converted to Islam upon their arrival, and given a new name. They were trained in the discipline of the palace harem, and in the accomplishments for which they had talent. They were then promoted according to their capacities.

 had the lowest rank of the women in the Imperial Harem. They differed from the odalisque in that they were all formally concubines to the sultan. However, in practice, they may never be chosen to share the bed of the sultan, so they often acted as the servants of the valide sultan, and the wives and children of the sultan.

A  who proved to be a valuable servant could be promoted to kalfa or usta, which meant she earned wages. In practice, her manumission would mean that a marriage was arranged for her, since an unmarried free woman without family had no means to support herself in the gender-segregated society of the Ottoman Empire.

The  with whom the sultan shared his bed became members of the dynasty and rose in rank to attain the status of gözde ('the favorite'), ikbal ('the fortunate'), kadin ('the mother of a child') or haseki sultan ('the favorite consort').

The number of women in the harem is contested and only possible to estimate during some periods. Contemporaries claimed that in 1573, there were 150 women in the New palace and 1,500 in the Old Palace, and that there were 1,100 - 1,200 in 1604–1607, but these numbers are likely overestimated.  The actual number of women are estimated to have been 49 in 1574 and 433 in 1633.  
In the 18th- and 19th-century, the official mevacib register is sometimes preserved, and notes that the harem contained 446 slave women during the reign of sultan Mahmud I (r.1730-1754), 720 during sultan Selim III (r. 1789–1808), and 473 during sultan Mahmud II (r.1808-1839).

See also

 Circassian beauties
 Concubinage in Islam
 Haseki Sultan
 Hatun
 Ikbal (title)
 Kadın (title)
 List of Ottoman titles and appellations
 Ottoman Sultans' concubines
 Rape in Islamic law
 History of concubinage in the Muslim world
 Valide Sultan
 What your right hands possess
 Women in the Ottoman Empire
 Jarya

References

Ottoman imperial harem
Slavery in the Ottoman Empire
Ottoman titles
Concubines of the Ottoman Empire
Sexual slavery